Qatar and the United States are strategic allies. Qatar has been designated a major non-NATO ally by the United States.

History 
The United States formed diplomatic relations with Qatar on 19 March 1972, when diplomat William Stoltzfus met with Qatari government officials and submitted his credentials. Bilateral relations between the two countries have expanded since the opening of the U.S. embassy in Doha in March 1973. The first resident U.S. ambassador arrived in July 1974. Qatar and the United States coordinate closely on Middle Eastern regional diplomatic initiatives to increase security in the Persian Gulf. The two countries also have extensive economic links, especially in the hydrocarbons sector. Qatar has also developed international educational institutions in the region to cater to the Middle Eastern market. Qatar also hosts an American military facility.

During the 2017 Qatar diplomatic crisis, the United States President Donald Trump claimed credit for engineering the diplomatic crisis in a series of tweets. On 6 June, Trump began by tweeting: "During my recent trip to the Middle East I stated that there can no longer be funding of Radical Ideology. Leaders pointed to Qatar – look!" An hour and a half later, he remarked on Twitter that it was "good to see the Saudi Arabia visit with the King and 50 countries already paying off. They said they would take a hard line on funding extremism, and all reference [sic] was pointing to Qatar. Perhaps this will be the beginning of the end to the horror of terrorism!" This was in contrast to attempts by The Pentagon and State department to remain neutral. The Pentagon praised Qatar for hosting the Al Udeid Air Base and for its "enduring commitment to regional security." U.S. Ambassador to Qatar, Dana Shell Smith, sent a similar message. Earlier, the US Secretary of State had taken a neutral stance and called for dialogue. Qatar hosts about 10,000 U.S. troops at Al Udeid Air Base, which houses the forward operating base of United States Central Command that plays a commanding role in US airstrikes in Syria, Iraq, and Afghanistan. A Pentagon spokesperson claimed the diplomatic crisis would not affect the US military posture in Qatar. On 8 June, President Donald Trump, during a phone call with the Emir of Qatar Tamim bin Hamad Al Thani, offered as a mediator in the conflict with a White House meeting between the parties if necessary. The offer was declined, and Qatari official stated, "The emir has no plans to leave Qatar while the country is under a blockade." On 9 June, Trump once put the blame on Qatar, calling the blockade "hard but necessary" while claiming that Qatar had been funding terrorism at a "very high level" and described the country as having an "extremist ideology in terms of funding". This statement was in conflict with Secretary of State Tillerson's comments on the same day, which called on Gulf states to ease up the blockade.

On 30 January 2018 an inaugural United States-Qatar Strategic Dialogue meeting was held, co-chaired by U.S. Secretary of State Rex Tillerson, U.S. Secretary of Defense Jim Mattis, Qatari Deputy Prime Minister and Minister of State for Defense Khalid al-Attiyah and Qatari Deputy Prime Minister and Foreign Minister Mohammed bin Abdulrahman Al Thani. The meeting expressed the need for an immediate resolution of the crisis which respects Qatar’s sovereignty. In a Joint Declaration on Security Cooperation the U.S. expressed its readiness to deter and confront any external threat to Qatar’s territorial integrity. Qatar offered to help fund the expansion of facilities at U.S. bases in Qatar.

Educational ties
Hundreds of Qatari students study in the United States. Six U.S. universities have branch campuses in Qatar's Education City complex. There are Virginia Commonwealth University School of the Arts in Qatar (VCUQ), Weill Cornell Medical College in Qatar (WCMC-Q), Texas A&M University at Qatar (TAMUQ), Carnegie Mellon University in Qatar (CMU-Q), Georgetown University School of Foreign Service in Qatar (SFS-Qatar), and Northwestern University in 2008.

Diplomatic exchanges

Diplomatic visits
Emir Tamim bin Hamad Al Thani visited Washington in July 2019, and President George W. Bush visited Qatar in 2003 where he spoke to troops stationed there.
Donald Rumsfeld, the 21st Secretary of Defense from 2001 to 2006, also visited Qatar in 2002. Secretary of State Hillary Clinton visited Qatar in February, 2010, and Secretary John Kerry traveled to Qatar in March, 2013.

Post Sheikh Tamim and Donald Trump’s meeting in July 2019, Qatar agreed to purchase "tremendous amounts of military equipment" and Boeing planes from the United States. The deal has been signed with some of the major US companies, including Boeing, General Electric, Raytheon, Gulfstream Aerospace and Chevron Phillips Chemical and is expected to cost tens of billions of dollars. Sheikh Tamim also announced to double Qatar’s current economic partnership of more than $185 billion with the US.

Residential staff 
 United States
Principal U.S. officials include:
 Ambassador – Timmy T. Davis
 Chargé d'affaires a.i – Evyenia Sidereas

The U.S. maintains an embassy in Doha, Qatar.

 Qatar
Principal Qatari officials include:
 Ambassador—Sheikh Meshal bin Hamad Al Thani: Ambassador of Qatar to the United States since December 2016

Qatar maintains an embassy in Washington, DC.

Bilateral Trade 
Qatar and the United States enjoy close economic and trade relations. The United States is Qatar's fifth trading partner and the primary source of imports which amounts to $4.108bn. During January–August 2021, the Qatar-US bilateral trade reached $3.2bn.

Military 
Beginning in 1992, Qatar has built intimate military ties with the United States, and is now the location of U.S. Central Command’s Forward Headquarters and the Combined Air Operations Center.

, the following American bases currently exist:
 Al Udeid Air Base
 As Sayliyah Army Base

In 2003, the US military base Doha International Air Base (also known as Camp Snoopy) was closed.

Former US Defense Secretary Robert Gates stated in May 2017 that he doesn't "know instances in which Qatar aggressively goes after (terror finance) networks of Hamas, Taliban, Al-Qaeda," and that "My attitudes toward Al-Udeid and any other facility is that the United States military doesn’t have any irreplaceable facility." Qatar hosts the largest American base in the Middle East, the Al Udeid Air Base, which has been used by the United States in its campaigns in Iraq, Syria and Afghanistan.

In 2014, the United States sold $11 billion worth of arms to Qatar, including AH-64 Apache attack helicopters and Patriot and Javelin defense systems.

In June 2017, Qatar signed a $12 billion deal to buy 36 F-15QA strike aircraft from the United States, with Boeing as the prime contractor on the sale.

Disaster aid
Qatar donated $100 million in aid to New Orleans after Hurricane Katrina ravaged the Gulf Coast in August 2005.

When Hurricane Harvey hit the state of Texas from August to September 2017, Qatar's ambassador announced on 8 September that the country would be donating $30 million in aid to help rebuild Texas.

References

External links
History of Qatar – U.S. relations

 Embassy of U.S.A. – Doha
 Embassy of Qatar – Washington D.C.

 
United States
Bilateral relations of the United States